Oscar Hamrén (19 September 1891 – 10 April 1960) was a Swedish swimmer. He competed in the men's 200 metre breaststroke event at the 1912 Summer Olympics.

References

External links
 

1891 births
1960 deaths
Olympic swimmers of Sweden
Swimmers at the 1912 Summer Olympics
Swimmers from Stockholm
Swedish male breaststroke swimmers